Webb and Knapp was a real estate development firm.

The company is most famous for developing the Roosevelt Airfield, which was the launching site of the transatlantic flights of Charles Lindbergh and Amelia Earhart. It was also the firm at which famed architect I. M. Pei first worked, from 1948 to 1956.

History
The company was founded in 1922 by Robert C. Knapp and W. Seward Webb.

William Zeckendorf joined the firm in 1938 and acquired it in 1949.

In the 1960s, the company filed for bankruptcy protection and Roosevelt Airfield was sold to Corporate Property Investors. The company at that time had total assets of about $21,500,00 and total liabilities of about $60 million, plus contingent tax liabilities of $29,400,000.

References

Real estate companies of the United States
Defunct real estate companies of the United States